Bromus is a large genus of grasses, classified in its own tribe Bromeae. They are commonly known as bromes, brome grasses, cheat grasses or chess grasses. Estimates in the scientific literature of the number of species have ranged from 100 to 400, but plant taxonomists currently recognize around 160–170 species.

Bromus is part of the cool-season grass lineage (subfamily Pooideae), which includes about 3300 species.  Within Pooideae, Bromus is classified in tribe Bromeae (it is the only genus in the tribe).  Bromus is closely related to the wheat-grass lineage (tribe Triticeae) that includes such economically important genera as Triticum (wheat), Hordeum (barley) and Secale (rye).

Etymology 
The generic name Bromus is derived from the Latin bromos, a borrowed word from the Ancient Greek .  and  mean oats, but  seems to have referred specifically to Avena sativa (Hippocrates On Regimen in Acute Diseases 2.43, Dioscorides Medicus 2.94, Polemo Historicus 88) and Avena barbata (Theophrastus Historia Plantarum 8.9.2, Pseudo-Dioscorides 4.137).

Description 
Bromus species occur in many habitats in temperate regions of the world, including Africa, America, Australia and Eurasia.  There are considerable morphological differences between some species, while the morphological differences between others (usually those species that are closely related) are subtle and difficult to distinguish.  As such, the taxonomy of the genus is complicated.

Bromus is distinguished from other grass genera by a combination of several morphological characteristics, including leaf sheaths that are closed (connate) for most of their length, awns that are usually inserted subapically, and hairy appendages on the ovary.  The leaf blades and sheaths, which comprise the leaves can be hairless, sparsely hairy or hairy. The inflorescence is a dense or open panicle, usually drooping or nodding, sometimes spreading (as in Japanese brome, B. japonicus).

Ecology 
The caterpillars of some Lepidoptera use Bromus as a foodplant, such as the chequered skipper (Carterocephalus palaemon).

Uses 
Bromus species are generally considered to have little economic value to humans, at least in present times. Bromus mango was historically cultivated in Chile and Argentina by indigenous peoples, who used it both as fodder and food. The Tarahumara Indians in northern Mexico use the grains of some native Bromus species to aid fermentation in making one of their cultural beverages. As names like poverty brome (B. sterilis) and ripgut brome (B. diandrus) attest, some species are not very useful as fodder because their leaves sclerotize quickly and may even be harmful to livestock due to the high silica content. Others, such as meadow brome (Bromus riparius), native to parts of Russia, are planted as forage in the Great Plains of North America.  Brome grasses are not usually grown as ornamental plants due to most species' nondescript appearance. Some are useful to prevent erosion but such use must be cautiously controlled as most Bromus have the ability to spread, becoming invasive weeds.  Cheatgrass (Bromus tectorum) is a particularly troublesome weed across much of western North America (from southern British Columbia to California.)

Taxonomy and systematics 

Taxonomists have generated various classification schemes to reflect the morphological variation that is seen in Bromus.  In North America, five morphologically similar groups of species, called sections, are generally recognized: Bromus, Genea, Ceratochloa, Neobromus, and Bromopsis.  Sections Bromus and Genea are native to the Old World (Eurasia), but many species are introduced into North America.  Sections Bromopsis, Neobromus, and Ceratochloa have several native species in North America.

Selected species

Gallery

See also
List of Poaceae genera

References

External links 

  Brome grasses UK
  Interactive Key to Bromus of North America
 

 
Poaceae genera
Grasses of Africa
Grasses of Asia
Grasses of Europe
Grasses of North America
Grasses of Oceania
Grasses of South America